Vavoom! is the fourth studio album by the swing band The Brian Setzer Orchestra. It was released in 2000 on Interscope Records.

Track listing
All tracks composed by Brian Setzer; except where indicated.

 "Pennsylvania 6-5000" (Setzer, Bill Finegan, Jerry Gray, Carl Sigman, Mike Himelstein)
 "Jumpin' East of Java"
 "Americano" (Setzer, Renato Carosone)
 "If You Can't Rock Me"
 "Gettin' In the Mood" (Mike Himelstein)
 "Drive Like Lightning (Crash Like Thunder)" (Setzer, Mark Winchester)
 "Mack the Knife" (Marc Blitzstein, Kurt Weill, Bertolt Brecht)
 "Caravan" (Irving Mills, Duke Ellington, Juan Tizol)
 "The Footloose Doll"
 "From Here to Eternity" (Setzer, Rick Bell)
 "That's the Kind of Sugar Papa Likes"
 "'49 Mercury Blues"
 "Jukebox"
 "Gloria" (Esther Navarro)
 "Rock-A-Beatin' Boogie" (Bill Haley) (Japan only bonus track)

Personnel
Brian Setzer - guitar, vocals
Bernie Dresel - drums, percussion
Ray Hermann - saxophone
George McMullen - trombone
Tim Misica - saxophone
Mark Winchester - bass
Robbie Hioki - trombone
Kevin Norton - trumpet
Mike Himelstein - background vocals
Kye Palmer - trumpet

Notes 

The Brian Setzer Orchestra albums
2000 albums
Albums produced by Glen Ballard
Albums produced by Peter Collins (record producer)
Albums produced by Dave Darling
Interscope Records albums